Venjaramoodu is a north-east suburb of Trivandrum city, the capital of Kerala.

Geography
Venjaramoodu is a town in the district of Thiruvananthapuram, Kerala. It is north of Thiruvananthapuram on MC Road (SH1). It comes under Nedumangad Taluk. The Kazhakkuttam bypass ends at Thycadu, near by Venjaramood. The nearest airport is Thiruvananthapuram International Airport and railway station is Chirayinkeezhu Railway station. Kerala State Road Transport Corporation operates a bus depot at Venjarammoodu. It is well connected to all parts of the state by state road transport buses. Gokulam Medical College and Muslim Association College of Engineering are located here. Venjaramoodu Government higher secondary school is located besides the Main Central road.

Transport

Road 
Two dedicated bus depots are available in the forms of a Kerala State Road Transport Corporation(KSRTC) bus depot and one private bus terminal, both in the heart of the town. 
KSRTC operate city bus service, local bus service and fast passenger.

City service using Anathapuri bus, low floor AC/ Non-AC, Venad.

Venjaramoodu- East fort via Pothenkodu/ Kaniyapuram- Kazhakoottam- Technopark-Chakka- General Hospital/ Enchakal.

Venjaramoodu- East fort Via Vembayam- Mannathala/ Sreekaryam- Pattom.

Local bus routes
Attingal, Nedumangadu, Medical College, Thampanur, Pothenkodu, Varkala, Ponmudy, Kilimanoor, Kallara, Vembayam, Muthuvila, Palode, Thempamoodu, etc.

All Super Fast, Fast, Express, Scania bus through MC road passing through Venjaramoodu KSRTC Bus dippo.

Private buses operate to Attingal, Varkala, Kadakkavour, Chirayinkeezhu, Paravour town.

Rail 
 Nearest railway stations
 Murukkumpuzha Railway station
 Chirayinkeezhu railway station
 Kadakkavoor railway station
 Varkala Railway Station
 Thiruvananthapuram Central  Railway station

Air 

Religion 
The population in Venjaramoodu practices Hinduism, Christianity and Islam. Venjaramoodu is also famous for Manikkodu Mahadeva Temple which  held every year 10 day  festival with Manikkodu carnival.

 Here is a list of important religious places:-
 Manikkodu Mahadeva Temple Vayyatte
 Pirappankodu Sree Krishna Temple
 Thiru Vamanamoothi Temple Anakudy (just )
 Venkamala Temple
 Kavara Bhagavathi Temple
 Mukkunur Sreekanda Shatha Temple
 Alanthara Uruttumandapam
 Alanthara Shastha Temple
 Vettur Mahavishnu Temple
 Subramanya Temple Thandrampoika
 Gokulathamma Temple, Gokulam Medical College
 Amundirath Devi Temple Mudakal
  Vidaynkavu Temple, Kunnida, Velavur
 Parameswram Temple
 Kottukunnam Mahadeva Temple
 Aliyadu Oorootumandapam Temple
 Venjaramoodu Muslim Juma Masjid
 Manikkal Juma Masjid
 Keezhayikonam  Masjid
 St.Joseph's Church Kottapuram, Pirappancode
 Koppam CSI Church
 Seventh Day Adventist Church Thumpara, Pirappancode

Notable people 
 Priyanka Nair, actress
 Thulasidas, film director
 Suraj Venjaramoodu, actor
 K.Raman Pillai, politician
 Harilal Rajendran, writer
 Noby Marcose, actor
 S R Lal, writer

Major banks 
 State Bank of Travancore
 State Bank of India
 Central Bank of India
 Federal Bank
 South Indian Bank
 Indian Overseas Bank
 Syndicate Bank
 Kerala Grameen Bank
 ICICI Bank
 Union Bank Pirapancodu
 Kerala Bank
 Canara Bank, Thycadu
 ESAF Bank, Thycadu
 Venjaramoodu service Co-Operative Bank

Climate
Venjaramoodu has significant rainfall most months, with a short dry season. This location is classified as Am by Köppen and Geiger. The temperature here averages . About  of precipitation falls annually. The driest month is January. At  on average, December is the coldest month of the year.

References

Villages in Thiruvananthapuram district